The 2022–23 Presbyterian Blue Hose men's basketball team represented Presbyterian College in the 2022–23 NCAA Division I men's basketball season. The Blue Hose, led by fourth-year head coach Quinton Ferrell, played their home games at the Templeton Physical Education Center in Clinton, South Carolina as members of the Big South Conference.

Previous season
The Blue Hose finished the 2021–22 season 12–20, 4–12 in Big South play to finish in fifth place in the South division. They were defeated by Campbell in the first round of the Big South tournament.

Roster

Schedule and results

|-
!colspan=12 style=| Non-conference regular season

|-
!colspan=9 style=| Big South Conference regular season

|-
!colspan=9 style=|Big South tournament

Sources

References

Presbyterian Blue Hose men's basketball seasons
Presbyterian Blue Hose
Presbyterian Blue Hose men's basketball
Presbyterian Blue Hose men's basketball